Hwang Yun-gil (1536–?), also known as Hwang Yun'gil, was a Korean diplomat and ambassador. He was a member of the Western faction in the Joseon court. He represented Joseon interests in a tongsinsa (diplomatic mission or corresponding envoys) to Sengoku period in Japan when it was controlled by strongman Toyotomi Hideyoshi.

1590 mission to Japan
In 1590-1591, King Seonjo of Joseon sent a mission to Japan led by Hwang Yun-gil, accompanied by Kim Seong-il and Heo Seong.  The chronology of this diplomatic embassy encompassed:
 September 1589 (22nd year of King Seonjo's rule: Gimi year): Dispatch of tongsinsa to Japan decided upon by the Joseon court.
 March 1590 (23rd year of King Seonjo's rule: Gyeongin year): The tongsinsa were sent to Japan.
 January 1591 (24th year of King Seonjo's rule: Sinmyo year): Hwang Yun-gil and others returned the port Busan.

A diplomatic mission conventionally consisted of three primary figures—the main envoy, the vice-envoy, and a document official. Also included were one or more official writers or recorders who created a detailed account of the mission. In 1607,  Hwang Yun-gil was the main envoy; and he was accompanied by Kim Sŏng-il, who was the vice-ambassador, and Hŏ Son, who was the document official.

See also
 Joseon diplomacy
 Joseon missions to Japan
 Joseon tongsinsa
 Tsūkō ichiran, mid-19th century text

Notes

References

 Kang, Etsuko Hae-jin. (1997). Diplomacy and Ideology in Japanese-Korean Relations: from the Fifteenth to the Eighteenth Century. Basingstoke, Hampshire; Macmillan. ; 
 Rutt, Richard and James Hoare. (1999). Korea: a Historical and Cultural Dictionary. London: Routledge.

External links
 Joseon Tongsinsa Cultural Exchange Association ; 

1536 births
Year of death unknown
1590 in Japan
1591 in Japan
Korean diplomats
Joseon scholar-officials
Jangsu Hwang clan